Müsaadenizle Çocuklar (With Your Permission, Guys) is the 11th and the last studio album from Barış Manço, released in 1995. This record arrived three years after his last effort, "Mega Manço". The title track was the most popular. aiming to criticize mainstream pop music.

Track listing
"Müsaadenizle Çocuklar" 
"Bal Böceği" 
"Yolla Yarim Tez Yolla" 
"Al Beni" 
"Sarıl Bana" 
"Benden Öte Benden Ziyade" 
"Gül Bebeğim" 
"Beyhude Geçti Yıllar"
"Yol" 
"En Büyük Mehmet Bizim Mehmet"

Personnel 

 Barış Manço
 Garo Mafyan
 Bahadır Akkuzu
 Hüseyin Cebeci
 Özlem Yüksek
 Burcu Yıldırım
 Halis Bütünley

References 

1995 albums